Behnaz (Persian: بهناز ) is a Persian girl's name.

Behnaz Akhgar (born 1980), British weather presenter
Behnaz Jafari (born 1975), Iranian actress
Behnaz Sarafpour, American fashion designer
Behnaz Shafiei (born 1989), Iranian female motocross rider